Eustace Maxwell (20 January 1864 – 18 May 1939) was an Australian cricketer. He played five first-class matches for Tasmania between 1888 and 1898.

See also
 List of Tasmanian representative cricketers

References

External links
 

1864 births
1939 deaths
Australian cricketers
Tasmania cricketers
Cricketers from Hobart